Ruokolahti (literally translated the "Reed Bay") is a municipality of Finland, situated in south-eastern Finland, in the region of South Karelia. Neighbouring municipalities are Imatra, Lappeenranta, Taipalsaari, Puumala, Sulkava, Punkaharju, Parikkala and Rautjärvi.

The municipality has  inhabitants
(), but the population doubles in summer as holidaymakers occupy the 3,000 summer cottages in the region.

Ruokolahti is known for its natural environment, for example Kummakivi is a balancing rock located at 61° 29' 36.4596" N, 28° 25' 45.5016" E in Ruokolahti and is protected. In the west there is the Lake Saimaa and in the east there are hundreds of smaller lakes. The Salpausselkä ridges run through the area.

The famous sniper Simo Häyhä lived in Ruokolahti for 57 years after the 1939–40 Winter War. He is buried there in the graveyard of Ruokolahti Church.

The municipal coat of arms of Ruokolahti is a canting arms that directly refers to the name of the municipality, including reeds appearing in it. Wave line is usually used to describe a local body of water. The coat of arms was designed by Gustaf von Numers and was confirmed for use on September 11, 1951.

Gallery

References

External links 

Municipality of Ruokolahti – Official website
Discover Ruokolahti – Information for tourists

Municipalities of South Karelia
Populated places established in 1868